Mozambique prohibits legal recognition of polygamous unions, yet there are no legal restrictions against the practice itself, which has been reported to be quite widespread in the coastal country. As of 2019, it was estimated that about nearly 20% of married women aged 15–49 are in polygynous unions. The first wife, called the "senior wife" enjoys  more recognition, not only because she is legally recognized, but also due to the long-standing traditions of Mozambique, that give her a higher rank than junior wives; and a higher bride price is paid for the senior wife.

References 

Society of Mozambique
Mozambique